The 2013–14 Bethune–Cookman Wildcats men's basketball team represented Bethune–Cookman University during the 2013–14 NCAA Division I men's basketball season. The Wildcats, led by third year head coach Gravelle Craig, played their home games at the Moore Gymnasium and were members of the Mid-Eastern Athletic Conference. They finished the season 7–25, 5–11 in MEAC play to finish in five way tie for eighth place. They lost in the first round of the MEAC tournament to Coppin State.

Roster

Schedule

|-
!colspan=9 style="background:#6A3547; color:#E4A41D;"| Regular season

|-
!colspan=9 style="background:#6A3547; color:#E4A41D;"| 2014 MEAC tournament

References

Bethune–Cookman Wildcats men's basketball seasons
Bethune-Cookman
Bethune-Cookman Wildcats men's basketball
Bethune-Cookman Wildcats men's basketball